During the 2009–10 German football season, Hamburger SV competed in the Bundesliga.

Season summary
Hamburg reached the Europa League semi-final for the second season running, but were eliminated by Fulham (thus missing out on the chance to play the final at their home ground). However, a seventh-placed finish in the final table meant that the club would not be competing in Europe for the first time in 7 years. Manager Bruno Labbadia paid for the poor form with his job in late April, with technical coach Ricardo Moniz taking charge for the final two games. Armin Veh was appointed permanent manager in May.

First-team squad
Squad at end of season

Left club during season

Competitions

Bundesliga

League table

DFB-Pokal

First round

Second round

Europa League

Third qualifying round

Play-off round

Group stage

Round of 32

Round of 16

Quarter-finals

Semi-finals

References

Notes

Hamburger SV seasons
Hamburger SV